John Burke (born 2 September 1957) is an English former professional rugby league footballer who played in the 1970s, selected at representative level for Great Britain (non-Test matches), and at club level for Wigan and Workington Town, as a  or , i.e. number 1, or 3 or 4.

Background
John Burke was born in Leigh, Lancashire, England.

Playing career

International honours
John Burke played 3 matches for the England/English Schoolboys against the Australian Schoolboys, played for Great Britain (Colts), and he was selected for Great Britain while at Workington Town for the 1978 Kangaroo tour of Great Britain and France.

County Cup Final appearances
John Burke played as an interchange/substitute (replacing  Steve Davies), and scored a goal in Wigan's 13-16 defeat by Workington Town in the 1977 Lancashire County Cup Final during the 1977–78 season at Wilderspool Stadium, Warrington, on Saturday 29 October 1977.
John is the only player to receive a winners and runners up medal for a cup final 1978/1979 Lancs cup final Workington v Widnes

Club career
John Burke  was transferred from Wigan to Workington Town during February 1978, he broke his back while playing for Workington Town against Leeds on Sunday 3 September 1978, he had previously been selected for Great Britain, and in 1981 he was presented with his cap by Rugby Football League officials; Thomas Mitchell (Workington Town), and Bill Oxley (Barrow).

References

External links
Search for "Burke" at rugbyleagueproject.org
Ex-Workington Town star Burke applauds RFL cash scheme
Obituary: Tom Mitchell 
RFL Benevolent Fund Assists

1957 births
Living people
English rugby league players
Rugby league fullbacks
Rugby league players from Leigh, Greater Manchester
Wigan Warriors players
Workington Town players